Parliamentary elections were held in Uruguay on 27 November 1919. Although the National Party won the most seats as a single party, the  various factions of the Colorado Party took over half the seats in the Chamber of Deputies.

Results

References

Elections in Uruguay
Uruguay
Parliamentary